Heeraganj is a village in Kunda tehsil, Babaganj block  basically famous by her attitude   Posted by gaurav pandit Pratapgarh district of Indian state Uttar Pradesh.

The village is known for pilgrim destination of ancient Nayar Devi Temple.

Geography 
It elevates (altitude) 110 meter above sea level. It is about 45 kilometer away from the district headquarters Bela Pratapgarh.

Tourism 
Maa Nayar Devi Temple is an old shrine situated in Heeraganj village. It is dedicated Hindu mother goddess Nayar, which said to be appeared from earth.

Transport 
All kinds of road and railway facilities are easily accessible to reach Heeraganj. It has distance of 55 from Allahabad and 45 kilometer from Pratapgarh. Heeraganj is reachable by nearest railway station such as Kunda Harnamganj, Garhi Manikpur, Bhadri.Lalganj, Kunda, Kalakankar, Babaganj are the nearby towns to Heeraganj.

References 

Villages in Pratapgarh district, Uttar Pradesh